Eauze Cathedral is a Roman Catholic church located in the town of Eauze, France. The former cathedral is a national monument. It was the ecclesiastical seat of the former Diocese of Eauze, which was merged into the Bishopric of Auch, probably in the 9th century. Eauze Cathedral is dedicated to Saint Luperculus, who is said to have been a bishop here in the 3rd century before being martyred.

External links
Location of the cathedral

Former cathedrals in France
Churches in Gers
Roman Catholic cathedrals in France